Marie van Waning-Stevels (1874-1943) was a Dutch painter.

Biography 
Waning-Stevels née Stevels was born on 2 December 1874 in Gorinchem. She attended the Akademie van beeldende kunsten (Royal Academy of Art, The Hague). She studied with Carolus Lambertus Waning. In 1906 she married fellow artist Cornelis Anthonij (Kees) van Waning (1861-1929).

Her work was included in the 1939 exhibition and sale Onze Kunst van Heden (Our Art of Today) at the Rijksmuseum in Amsterdam. She was a member of the Pulchri Studio in The Hague.

Waning-Stevels died on 14 August 1943 in Zeist.

External links

References

1874 births
1943 deaths
People from Gorinchem
20th-century Dutch women artists